Yadukulakamboji or Yadukulakambodi (yadukulakāmbhōji) is a rāgam in Carnatic music (musical scale of South Indian classical music). It is a janya rāgam (derived scale) from the 28th melakarta scale Harikambhoji, and is sometimes spelled as Yadukulakambhoji or Yadukulakambhodi. It is a janya scale, as it does not have all the seven swaras (musical notes) in the ascending scale. It is a combination of the pentatonic scale Shuddha Saveri and the sampurna raga scale Harikambhoji.

Structure and Lakshana 

Yadukulakamboji is an asymmetric rāgam that does not contain gandharam and nishadam in the ascending scale. It is an audava-sampurna rāgam (or owdava rāgam, meaning pentatonic ascending scale). Its  structure (ascending and descending scale) is as follows:

 : 
 : 

The notes used in this scale are shadjam, chathusruthi rishabham, shuddha madhyamam, panchamam and chathusruthi dhaivatam in ascending scale, with kaisiki nishadham and antara gandharam included in descending scale. For the details of the notations and terms, see swaras in Carnatic music.

Popular compositions
There are many compositions set to Yadukula kamboji rāgam. Here are some popular kritis composed in this ragam.

Kāmākṣhī padayugame sthiramaninē, by Shyama Shastri ( Very Famous svarajati)
Hecharikaga ra rama, Ni Dayache Rama, etavuna nerchitivo, and Sri Rama Jayarama composed by Tyagaraja
Divakara tanujam and Tyagarajam bhajare by Muthuswami Dikshitar
Ikshvaku kula by Bhadrachala Ramadasu
Mohanamayi and Bhujaga shayino by Swathi Thirunal Rama Varma
Paramakripa sagari pahi parameshvari by G. N. Balasubramaniam
Kalaith thookki nindradum by Marimutthu Pillai
Anagha Shambho by Thulaseevanam
sharade pahi mam by Mysore Vasudevacharya
Padmanabham Bhajeham by Maharaja Jayachamarajendra Wadiyar
Kumaran thal paninde by Papanasam Sivan
Lalithe Mampahi Daya by Sri Chengalvaraya Sastri
thondar anju by Thirugnanasambandar

Film Songs

Language:Tamil

Related rāgams 
This section covers the theoretical and scientific aspect of this rāgam.

Scale similarities 
Shuddha Saveri has a symmetric pentatonic scale, with the notes same as the ascending scale of Yadukulakamboji. Its  structure is : 
Kedaragaula is a rāgam which has the kaishiki nishadam in ascending scale in place of the chatushruti daivatam. Its  structure is :

Notes

References

Janya ragas